The Mexico national baseball team (Spanish: Selección de béisbol de México) is the baseball team that represents Mexico in international tournaments. It is currently the 5th-ranked baseball team in the world.

Roster

Results and fixtures
The following is a list of professional baseball match results currently active in the latest version of the WBSC World Rankings, as well as any future matches that have been scheduled.

Legend

2019

2021

2023

International competition

World Baseball Classic
Mexico has competed in all four editions of the World Baseball Classic.

Game log

1 – Mexico score always listed first

Premier12 Tournament

2015
Team Mexico came in fourth in the 2015 WBSC Premier12 Tournament.

2019
Team Mexico won the bronze medal in the 12-team 2019 WBSC Premier12 Tournament in November 2019. Two quota spots were allocated from the Tournament, of the spots for six baseball teams at the 2020 Olympic Games, with Mexico as the top finisher from the Americas earning one spot. First baseman/left fielder Efrén Navarro led the team with three doubles and shared the team lead with six RBIs, designated hitter Matt Clark led the team with a .440 OBP and an .800 slugging percentage and shared the team lead with three home runs, and second baseman Esteban Quiroz led the team with seven walks. Half the Team Mexico roster consisted of players with birth certificates form the United States.

International tournament results

World Baseball Classic

Olympic Games

Premier12 Tournament

Pan American Games
1951: Bronze 
1963: Bronze 
2003: Bronze 
2007: Bronze

Central American and Caribbean Games
1926: Silver 
1930: Silver 
1950: Silver 
1954: Silver 
1962: Bronze 
1970: Bronze 
1993: Silver 
2006: Bronze

Baseball World Cup
1941: Bronze 
1943: Silver 
1944:  Silver 
1961:  Silver 
1965: Silver

U-23 Baseball World Cup
2018: Gold  
2021: Silver

References

External links
Selección Mexicana de Béisbol
Liga Mexicana de Beisbol
 
 

National
National baseball teams
baseball